Zhu Cong (born 8 February 1985) is a Chinese footballer as a full back. Who currently plays for China League Two side Shenzhen Renren.

Club career
Zhu started his professional career with Chinese Jia-A League side Shenzhen Jianlibao in 2003. On 19 August 2006, he made his senior debut in a 5–0 away defeat against Dalian Shide, coming on as a substitute for Fan Xiaodong in the 76th minute. He failed to establish himself within the first team and just played 6 league matches between 2004 and 2010. Zhu transferred to China League One club Guangdong Sunray Cave in July 2010.

In 2015, Zhu signed for Shenzhen Renren.

Career statistics
Statistics accurate as of match played 13 October 2018.

Honours

Club
Shenzhen Jianlibao
 Chinese Super League: 2004

References

1989 births
Living people
Chinese footballers
Footballers from Zhanjiang
People from Zhanjiang
Shenzhen F.C. players
Guangdong Sunray Cave players
Chinese Super League players
China League One players
Association football defenders